The Initial D (D) video game series or known as Initial D Arcade Stage is an arcade racing game series developed by Sega, based on the anime and manga series Initial D. In the United States and Europe, the game series is simply known as Initial D.

Premise 
In the Initial D video game franchise, players race against different opponents through various mountain passes featured in the manga. Vehicles that are featured in the game are mostly Japanese cars, such as the Nissan Skyline GT-R, Mazda RX-7, Mitsubishi Lancer Evolution, Honda Civic, as well as the Toyota AE86. Using the optional magnetic card system (arcade instalments from Arcade Stage Zero and later utilize Amusement IC, Banapassport or Aime cards rather than dedicated magnetic cards), players can save a customized car as well as their progress for future sessions; otherwise, their game progress is deleted. Players can continue growth with their cards on another Initial D cabinet of the same version. However, the card must be renewed every 50 plays.

Resuming from another version is subject to the following conditions:
 There is no backward compatibility (i.e., a version 2 card cannot be used on version 1 machine).
 Upgrading the card to a more recent machine is permanent.
 When upgrading from one version to another, remaining plays will be carried over, and 50 plays will be credited to the card.

There are 13 games in the series; 10 for arcades and 3 for home consoles.
 Initial D Arcade Stage Ver.1 (Arcade)
 Initial D Arcade Stage Ver.2 (Arcade)
 Initial D Arcade Stage Ver.3 (Arcade)
 Initial D Arcade Stage 4 (Arcade)
 Initial D Arcade Stage 5 (Arcade)
 Initial D Arcade Stage 6 AA (Arcade)
 Initial D Arcade Stage 7 AAX (Arcade)
 Initial D Arcade Stage 8 Infinity (Arcade)
 Initial D Arcade Stage Zero (Arcade)
 Initial D: The Arcade (Arcade)
 Initial D Special Stage (PlayStation 2)
 Initial D Street Stage (PSP)
 Initial D Extreme Stage (PS3)

Game modes
 Legend of the Streets
 In the main story mode, players race with opponents from the manga with their opponents increasing in difficulty during the progression of the game. In the English versions of the game, until the release of Arcade Stage 4, their names are derived from the Tokyopop manga.

 Time attack
 Players race in a timed game to rank highest against other players at their current machine or online. From Arcade Stage Ver.2/Special Stage to Arcade Stage 6 AA, players could change stages' weather conditions. This feature was removed from Arcade Stage 7 AAX to Arcade Stage 8 Infinity.

 Bunta Challenge
 First started in Arcade Stage Ver.2 to Arcade Stage Ver.3/Street Stage the player races against Bunta Fujiwara, the legendary street racer in the Initial D series. Each time Bunta is defeated, the player will gain a level, and difficulty increases. In Arcade Stage Ver.3, the player loses 1000 points upon defeat. Regardless, the end credits still roll if you win or lose to Bunta. Bunta's car differs across levels, levels 1-6: AE86 Trueno, levels 7-11: AE86 Trueno w/TRD 20-Valve 4AGE Racing Engine levels 12-15: GC8V Subaru Impreza WRX STi Version V. This model was discontinued and removed in Arcade Stage 4/Extreme Stage. However, Bunta appeared as a final boss in Akina. It later returned in Arcade Stage 7 AAX (Only in Legend mode after clearing Rebirth mode).

 Online Battle
 This was introduced in Arcade Stage 4/Extreme Stage, this mode allowed players to race against others located in Japan and some areas Asia.

 Racer's Event
Introduced in Arcade Stage 5 to Arcade Stage 8 Infinity. Only two modes are included in-game,  such as online battle and time attack.

 Tag Battle
 Introduced in Arcade Stage 6 AA through to Arcade Stage 8 Infinity, this mode allows players in the same location to team up. One player drives uphill and the other downhill to race with rivals. Matches are made based on past racing results, pitting drivers with similar levels against each other. When there is a difference in the level with your tag partner, the stronger driver will match with a stronger driver and a weaker driver with a weaker driver. The team with the highest score wins.

 Project Kanto's Fastest/Operation Kanto
 First introduced in Arcade Stage 7 AAX, this mode is similar to tag battle mode, where players race against the rival characters based in the manga from Gunma to Kanagawa area. In races against Project D's Ace, courses are random. In Arcade Stage 8 Infinity, new rivals include Tohru and Atsuro in Momiji Line, Sakamoto and Wataru in Sadamine Rain, and The Lan Evo Teams in Tsuchisaka.

Games Versions

Version 1
Japanese July 6, 2002, English version: 2002

Beginning with four courses such as Myogi (Night Kids' home course), Usui (Impact Blue's home course), Akina (Takumi's home course), and Happogahara (Todou School's first home course).

Version 2
Japanese version: December 10, 2002, English version: 2002

With two new courses such as Akagi, Takahashi brothers' home course, and Irohazaka, Emperor's home course. And additional rivals such as Kenji, 2 Guys from Tokyo, Kenta Nakamura, Kyoko Iwase, Nobuhiko Akiyama and Sakamoto.

Version 3
Japanese version: January 27, 2004, English version: 2004

The Lan Evo Team's home course is one of the new courses such as Akina Snow (only night), Shomaru, which was initially an exclusive for Special Stage and Tsuchisaka,  Also, new opponents in the game are Tohru Suetsugu, Atsuro Kawai, Miki, and the Tsucisaka Lan Evo team. New cars featured in the game are the Mitsubishi Lancer Evolution V, Lancer Evolution VI T.M. Edition, Mazda RX-8, and the  Nissan Skyline 25GT-T. The game features original Eurobeat songs from artists including Matt Land, Powerful T., Ace Warrior, and Marco Polo.

Stage 4

Japanese Version: February 21, 2007, English version: July 2007

It is also known in the updated version (Version 1.50) as Initial D Arcade Stage 4 Kai is the fourth release in the Initial D Arcade Stage series. Unlike the first three versions of the game, the game runs on the Sega Lindbergh hardware, uses a new card system, and features a new physics system. This arcade game also becomes the last game in Western before going to the next arcade game (Japanese language only). Only two new rivals such as God Hand and God Foot. Competitors from previous games such as Miki, the Tsucisaka Lan Evo team, Sakamoto, Nobuhiko Akiyama, and Tohru Suetsugu have been removed. New courses such as Lake Akina, Myogi (new layout with four sections), and Tsukuba Fruit Line. Some cars featured in previous games such as the Lancer Evolution VII and Toyota Celica have been removed.

Stage 5
Released on February 25, 2009 in Japan, Initial D Arcade Stage 5 was the second game in the series released on the Sega Lindbergh hardware. A few notable differences include massive physics changes. Compared to Arcade Stage 4/Extreme Stage, which used "drifting" physics, Arcade Stage 5 featured more realistic driving physics, which included tire and brake wear down. Although the tire and brake wear are not displayed anywhere in the game, experienced players can notice the difference in the change in physics as they progress in races.

New characters that appeared for the first time in the game are Kobayakawa, Satoshi Omiya, Imposter Project D, Kai Kogashiwa (R.T. Katagiri S.V.), and Hideo Minagawa.
New courses such as Happogahara, which used from Arcade Stage Ver.1 to Arcade Stage Ver.3/Street Stage (only daytime used is night) and only Extreme Stage appeared with full daytimes between day and night and Nagao, R.T. Katagiri S.V.'s home course.

Stage 6 AA
This version was released on March 3, 2011.

A new mode, Tag Battle, was introduced. Unlike its predecessor, it was released for the Sega RingEdge hardware for the first time. The game saw a change in its driving physics. Unlike Initial D Arcade Stage 5, a drift gauge and an updated tachometer were introduced to help inform players when they were drifting. The 'Legend of the Street' mode also introduced a "Rolling Start" since the story mode in Initial D Special Stage. The tachometer now informed players whether or not their speed was below the gear range. Online network was extended to support regions in which earlier versions of the game was known to be popular in, finally achieving both nationwide and international matches. New cars and courses were added to the game through online updates without upgrade kits like IDAS4 1.5. The game also added a mileage system to show players their total driven mileage. Mileages could be used to redeem exclusive cars that were later available in updates. New characters that appeared for the first time in the game include Ryuji Ikeda, Hiroya Okuyama, Go Hojo, and Rin Hojo. New course such as Usui, which used from Arcade Stage Ver.1 to Arcade Stage Ver.3/Street Stage appeared with new layout, Tsubaki Line, Sadamine and Akina Snow, also appeared before in Arcade Stage Ver.3 which daytime is night change into the day.

Note: AA = Double Ace

Stage 7 AAX

Released for Sega RingEdge on November 28, 2012. Like its predecessor, the legend of the streets mode from Original and Another mode are the same as the previous one (Arcade Stage 6 A.A.) with Rebirth mode. The game is mostly a carry-over from Initial D Arcade Stage 6 A.A., including updates. New characters include Shinji Inui to complete the Sidewinder battles of Project D, also Arcade Stage Ver.2/Special Stage and Arcade Stage Ver.3/Street Stage characters such as Nobuhiko Akiyama (Rebirth), Sakamoto and Tohru Suetsugu (only in Legend) appeared in this game and rewind of Keisuke, from Project.D using Kyoko's F.D. New cars include the Toyota Sprinter Trueno 2door and the new Toyota 86 G.T. (to replace the FT-86 prototype from the previous game). A new class of vehicles is introduced in this game called "Complete Cars." These include pre-tuned cars from several tuning shops in Japan, such as RE Amemiya. Online battles now include tag battles, allowing two in-store machines linking together and with internet access to battle against two other players in tag battles. New courses such as Tsuchisaka, which previously used in Arcade Stage Ver.3/Street Stage also appeared and Nanamagari, Team Spiral's home course. In this game, there are three songs which also used from Arcade Stage Ver.3/Street Stage and only a song from Arcade Stage Ver.2/Special Stage with new songs. The ending theme of this game is Gamble Rumble (7th Stage Version) by m.o.v.e., the first theme remix of Initial D Third Stage, Arcade Stage Ver.2/Special Stage and Arcade Stage Ver.3.

Stage 8 Infinity
Having been released on July 17, 2014, like its predecessor, this game carries overall game modes from the previous version with a notable addition of Initial D Factory and D Coins. In Story Mode, the players can play the Team Side or Rival Side to see Driving Training Curriculum or what mission is for each story. The game added a new feature, "1 Day 1 Time Continue," to allow players to have a free continue per day without inserting credits. New courses such as Momiji Line, for the first time in Special Stage, appeared with new layout and Hakone, the place for a battle between Ryosuke's F.C. and Rin Hojo's R32. Arcade Stage Ver.3/Street Stage characters such as Miki, Atsuro Kawai, and The Lan Evo Teams also return. This is the last game with Japanese voice actors before Arcade Stage Zero, which does not feature voice anymore.

Online services for Stage 8 Infinity have been concluded since April 27, 2017, which includes Initial D.net services.

Stage Zero
Released for the Sega Nu2 arcade system board on March 7, 2017. Unlike its predecessors, this game now uses a 6-speed gear shifter (similar to the ones found in the Wangan Midnight Maximum Tune games) as opposed to the sequential ones. The character designs are taken from New Initial D the Movie with entirely new BGMs that are rock songs from the films such as Backdraft Smiths, Clutcho, The Hug Me, The Valves, and Gekkou Green. A small number of Eurobeat songs from previous games are also featured but have to be unlocked. Rain condition was removed as the New Initial D movies featured no race in such condition.

As like Stage 4 (which arcade system board has changed too), a number of vehicles and tracks are unavailable upon launch, but later added back through free updates later in the year. Although most of the opponents are from New Initial D the Movie series, some rivals who didn't appear in the film such as Daiki Ninomiya, Kai Kogashiwa, Kyoichi Sudo, Kyoko Iwase, and Tomoyuki Tachi also appeared (with films' design). As well as Kanata Katagiri, protagonist of Initial D's sequel MFGHOST.

As collaboration which was used by Japanese Auto Magazine Hot Version (formerly known as Best Motoring), "Gunma Cycle Sports Center", where the magazine's most Touge challenges was filmed at, is added along with four pre-tuned cars appeared in the challenges.

The Version 2 update was released on April 18, 2019, and featured Shun Aiba and NISMO GT-R's 2017 Model, which appeared in MFGHOST

Special Stage
Initial D Special Stage was released on June 26, 2003, for the PlayStation 2 and was re-released on February 26, 2004, under the "PlayStation 2 the Best" label. Initial D Special Stage is based on Initial D Arcade Stage Ver.2 with additional Japanese voices for the first time and contains many features exclusive to this game. Initial D Special Stage is also the first home-console Initial D game published by Sega.

This version contains a story mode that allows the player to reenact racing scenes from the Initial D manga series (up to Vol. 25 at the time of publication), as well as several new courses then not seen in the arcade versions of the game. In one of these courses, Shomaru went on to appear in Initial D Arcade Stage Ver.3/Street Stage. Real Myogi was later added back in Initial D Arcade Stage 4/Extreme Stage. Momiji Line would not return until Initial D Arcade Stage 8 Infinity. Bunta's Challenge is noticeably absent in the game. Additional features, including replays for saved time-attack records and Iketani's car introduction.

Due to PlayStation 2's hardware limitations, the graphics of the game was downgraded from its arcade counterpart. The game is compatible with Logitech's Driving Force wheel series, and other wheel controllers made for PlayStation 2. Sega also balanced all the cars in-game due to the overpowering Integra DC2 from Initial D Arcade Stage Ver.2.

Street Stage
Initial D Street Stage is a PSP-exclusive game based on Initial D Arcade Stage Ver.3. This game features Dogfight by M.o.v.e. as its intro theme, which also used as the first opening theme of Initial D Fourth Stage. The legend of the street mode, which pits players against the rival characters are the same as the arcade game, but Akina (Snow) is removed, meaning the battle with Miki is also removed, although his theme can be found in the game's BGM files.

Initial D Extreme Stage

Initial D Extreme Stage  is a PlayStation 3 game based on Initial D Arcade Stage 4.

Reception
Initial D Arcade Stage (2001) sold 2,534 hardware units in Japan up until 2004. Initial D Arcade Stage Ver. 3 sold 673 units between April 2004 and March 2005. Combined, both versions of the game sold approximately  units up until March 2005.

Initial D Arcade Stage 4 sold 3,904 units in 2007, including 3,056 units by March 2007, and 848 during April–September 2007.

References

External links
 

Arcade video games
Arcade-only video games
Initial D video games
Video game franchises
Kodansha franchises
Sega arcade games
Sega Games franchises
Multiplayer and single-player video games
Video games developed in Japan
Video games set in Japan